In South Africa, a potjiekos , literally translated "small-pot food", is a dish  prepared outdoors.  It is traditionally cooked in a round, cast iron, three-legged cauldron, the potjie, descended from the Dutch oven brought from the Netherlands to South Africa in the 17th century and found in the homes and villages of people throughout southern Africa. The pot is heated using small amounts of wood or charcoal or, if fuel is scarce, twisted grass or even dried animal dung.

History
Traditionally, the recipe includes meat, vegetables like carrots, cabbage, cauliflower or pumpkin, starches like rice or potatoes, all slow-cooked with Dutch-Malay spices, the distinctive spicing of South Africa's early culinary melting pot. Other common ingredients include fruits and flour-based products like pasta.

Potjiekos originated with the Voortrekkers, evolving as a stew made of venison and vegetables (if available), cooked in the potjie. As trekkers (pioneers) shot wild game, it was added to the pot. The large bones were included to thicken the stew. Each day when the wagons stopped, the pot was placed over a fire to simmer. New bones replaced old and fresh meat replaced meat eaten. Game included venison, poultry such as guinea fowl, warthog, bushpig, rabbit, and hare.

Ingredients and general process

Cooking oil is added to a potjie, and placed on a fire until hot. Meat is added, typically lamb or pork. The meat is spiced and often a form of alcohol is added for flavor - mostly beer, Old Brown Sherry or a dessert wine like Humbro. The views of Afrikaner cooks in matters of seasoning tend to be conservative; garlic, for instance, is used very sparingly, if at all.

When the meat is lightly browned, vegetables like potatoes and mealies (maize) are added, along with whatever spices are needed. Water or other liquids may or may not then be added, depending on the views of the potjie chef. The lid is then closed and the contents left to simmer slowly without stirring. This distinguishes a potjiekos from a stew that is stirred. The aim is that the flavours of the different ingredients mix as little as possible. Although some chefs may permit stirring from time to time (which is highly frowned upon), it does create a stew where all the ingredients tend to blend together and taste similar. This is also the main difference between a stew and potjiekos i.e. in a potjie you do not stir. The reason for this is so that the flavour from the meat at the bottom can flavour all the vegetables above while slow cooking. If your potjie is made properly you should still be able to see and taste all the ingredients separately as well as a delicious whole.  Little sauce or water is used, so that cooking is by steam and not boiling in a sauce like a stew; thus the heat must be very low and constant. These are some of the secrets of each cook. A potjie is a social activity, with guests generally engaging in fireside chitchat while the potjie cooks, typically three to six hours.

A potjie is usually accompanied by rice or something similar, like pap.

Health hazards
In 1998, it was reported that potjie pots with large amounts of lead were being sold, placing users at risk of lead poisoning.

See also

 Braai
 Hot pot
 List of African dishes
 List of stews
 Perpetual stew
 Potbrood
 Sač

References

External links

Cooking vessels
South African cuisine
Stews
Wild game dishes